Fernando Paternoster (24 May 1903 – 6 June 1967) was an Argentine footballer and manager. He played for the Argentina national football team and helped promote football across South America in countries such as Colombia and Ecuador.

Playing career

Club

Paternoster started his career in the youth team of Atlanta in 1919. He made his breakthrough into the first team in 1921.

In 1926 Paternoster joined Racing Club de Avellaneda where he played until 1932. Between 1930 and 1931, he was loaned for free by Racing to Vélez Sársfield to play for the club in a Pan-American tour that took them from Chile to the United States.

In 1936 he made a single appearance for Argentinos Juniors.

National team

Paternoster was part of the Argentina squad that finished runner-up to Uruguay in the 1928 Olympic football tournament. He played in the 1929 South American Championship, helping Argentina win the title. In 1930 he was again in an Argentine team that finished as runner up to Uruguay, this time in the 1930 FIFA World Cup. He made a total of 16 appearances for Argentina.

Managerial career

Paternoster became the coach of Colombian team Club Municipal de Deportes in 1937. In 1938, he was selected to become manager of the Colombia national football team. He managed Deportivo Manizales in 1951. In 1954, he led Atlético Nacional to the Colombian league championship. In his later years, he worked to promote football in Ecuador, serving as manager of Emelec in the 1960s. He led the team to the national championship in 1965.

Honours

Manager
Atlético Nacional
Categoría Primera A (1): 1954

Emelec
Campeonato Ecuatoriano de Futbol (1): 1965

References

External links

1903 births
1967 deaths
Sportspeople from Buenos Aires Province
1930 FIFA World Cup players
Argentine footballers
Club Atlético Atlanta footballers
Racing Club de Avellaneda footballers
Club Atlético Vélez Sarsfield footballers
Argentinos Juniors footballers
Footballers at the 1928 Summer Olympics
Olympic footballers of Argentina
Olympic silver medalists for Argentina
Argentina international footballers
Argentine football managers
Colombia national football team managers
Atlético Nacional managers
Independiente Medellín managers
C.S. Emelec managers
Olympic medalists in football
Medalists at the 1928 Summer Olympics
Argentine people of German descent
Association football defenders